Steven Malcolm is a Christian Hip-Hop recording artist from Grand Rapids, Michigan. His music has been streamed over 35 million times, has been featured on Spotify’s New Music Friday, been used by the NBA on ESPN, and on VH1’s “Black Ink Crew”.

Early life
He grew up in Kalamazoo, Michigan; Tampa, Florida; and Grand Rapids, Michigan.

Career

Music
Malcolm released his 2013 mixtape Real Hip Hop, and a year later self-released the full-length Monsters Ink. He went on to competitions and live performances and was named to Rapzilla's Freshmen of 2016 list. After he signed with Word Entertainment and became the first artist on its newly established hip-hop imprint, 4 Against 5, Malcolm reached the streaming charts in early 2017 with the pop-rap tune "Party in the Hills," featuring Andy Mineo and Hollyn. His label debut, Steven Malcolm, was released that February and registered on Billboard's Top Christian Albums chart. Malcolm performed at that year's GMA Dove Awards and was nominated in three categories. Between albums, Malcolm recorded verses for other artists, including Torey D'Shaun's "Boomerang (Remix)" and Evan and Eris' "Be Alright." Malcolm's second album for 4 Against 5, The Second City, was released in January 2019.

Personal life 
Steven married Teaira on Friday August 17, 2018. They were married in Steven's hometown of Grand Rapids, Michigan at The Revel Center.

Discography

Studio albums

Extended plays

Singles 

*The original version of "Even Louder" features Leeland, and appears on The Second City.

Awards

GMA Dove Awards

!Ref.
|-
|rowspan="3"| 2017
| Steven Malcolm
| New Artist of the Year
| 
| rowspan="3"|
|-
| Steven Malcolm
| Rap/Hip Hop Album of the Year
| 
|-
| "Party in the Hills"
| Rap/Hip Hop Recorded Song of the Year
| 
|-
|rowspan="2"| 2019
| The Second City
| Rap/Hip Hop Album of the Year
| 
| rowspan="2"|
|-
| "Even Louder" 
| Rap/Hip Hop Recorded Song of the Year
| 
|-
| 2021
| "Glory on Me" 
| Rap/Hip Hop Recorded Song of the Year
| 
| 
|-
| 2022
| "Ain't Playin'" 
| Rap/Hip Hop Recorded Song of the Year
| 
| 
|}

Notes

References

21st-century American singers
21st-century Christians
21st-century American male singers
American performers of Christian music
Performers of contemporary Christian music
Living people
1991 births